The Patrusky lecture series is held by the Council for the Advancement of Science Writing (CASW) in honor of Ben Patrusky, who retired from CASW in 2013 after 25 years as the executive director of CASW and 30 years as the director of the New Horizons in Science program. The first lecture was held in 2013 and the event has taken place every year since then.

The Lecturers
 2013 — George M. Whitesides
 2014 — Donald Johanson
 2015 — Jo Handelsman
 2016 — Steven Weinberg
 2017 — Susan Desmond-Hellmann
 2018 — Shirley Tilghman
 2019 — Steve Squyres
 2020 — Ruha Benjamin
 2021 — Katharine Hayhoe
 2022 – Alyssa A. Goodman

References 

Awards established in 2013
Lecture series
Science writing awards